The Shanghai–Chongqing Expressway, designated as G50 and commonly referred to as the Huyu Expressway is an east-west bound expressway that connects the cities of Shanghai, China in Yangtze River Delta, and Chongqing in western China. The expressway runs through six provinces/municipalities and adjoin major cities such as Wuhu, Anqing, Wuhan and Yichang, roughly parallel to G42 Shanghai-Chengdu Expressway to its south. The thoroughfare begins at Huqingping Outer Ring Interchange near Hongqiao International Airport, where it meets S20 Outer Ring Expressway in Shanghai, and terminates at an interchange in Jiangbei District, where the highway joins G75 Lanzhou-Haikou Expressway. It is fully complete and spans  in length.

Route Description

Shanghai
The Shanghai–Chongqing Expressway begins at an interchange with S20 Outer Ring Expressway and Yan'an Elevated Road near Hongqiao International Airport. It then intersects with G15 Shenyang-Haikou Expressway via a turbine interchange, and G1501 Shanghai Outer Ring Expressway, before leaving Shanghai near Dianshan Lake.

This portion of G50 was originally named Huqingping Expressway, completed in 2008, and was designated as Route A9. It runs roughly parallel to G318 in Shanghai, which was originally named Huqingping Highway.

Yangtze River Delta Region
It runs primarily within the border of Wujiang District in Suzhou. It intersects with G15W Changshu–Taizhou Expressway just west of the Beijing-Hangzhou Grand Canal and continues detouring Lake Tai to its south. G50 then enters Zhejiang at the historic town of Nanxun in Nanxun District. In Zhejiang, the expressway becomes a four-lane  toll road. After entering Zhejiang in Nanxun District, the expressway passes through the city of Huzhou to the north of city center. At Hongqiao Town to the southeast of Changxin County, G50 meets G25 Changchun-Shenzhen Expressway, and continues westbound until Jiepai Village, where it enters Anhui province.

Anhui

It then heads to detour the city of Xuancheng to its south, and heads northwest to Wuhu. At a cloverleaf interchange, the G50 meets G5011 Wuhu–Hefei Expressway and G4211 Nanjing–Wuhu Expressway. Here, the G50 turns south to circumvent Wuhu and follows Yangtze River. The expressway meets G3 Beijing–Taipei Expressway outside of Tongling and continues southwest. Before crossing Yangtze River at Anqing Bridge outside of Anqing, the expressway encounters and concurs with G4212 Hefei–Anqing Expressway and G35 Jinan–Guangzhou Expressway. The Anqing Bridge carries four lanes of the expressway through Yangtze River to the north. G50 then splits with G4212 at a cloverleaf interchange northeast to Huaining County and heads southwest again, following the Yangtze River. After detouring Qianshan County, G50 splits with G35 and continues southwest bound. In Susong County, the expressway tilts westward and enters Hubei province at the border of Huangmei County.

Hubei

In Hubei, the expressway becomes a four-lane,  toll road. It enters Hubei in Huangmei County. In Huangmei, the expressway meets and concurs with G70 Fuzhou–Yinchuan Expressway, following the curvature of Yangtze River. The expressway then meets and concurs with G45 Daqing–Guangzhou Expressway at an interchange in Xishui County just east of downtown Huangshi, and becomes a six-lane highway, carried across Yangtze River via Huangshi Bridge. The concurrency with G45 ends just west of downtown Huangshi, and the G50-G70 concurrency continues westbound as a four-lane expressway until an interchange at the village of Dawu just outside Wuhan. There, G50 meets Hubei S7 Guanshankou-Baoxie Expressway, splits with G70, and concurs with G4201 Wuhan Outer Ring Expressway, bending away from downtown Wuhan. G50 concurs with most of G4201's southern tier and meets G4 Beijing–Hong Kong and Macau Expressway in Jiangxia District, Wuhan. There, the expressway widens to a six-lane toll road again, and connects with Hubei S11 Qingling-Zhengdian Expressway. The traffic is then carried across Yangtze River via Junshan Bridge. G50 then intersects with Hubei S13 Wuhan-Jianli Expressway and heads northwest to detour downtown Wuhan. G50 splits with G4201 and heads westbound. In Caidian District, G50 meets Hubei S15 Hanyang-Caidian Expressway, but westbound traffic on G50 does not have access to S15 because only two ramps were constructed to accommodate westbound traffic entering G50 from S15 and eastbound traffic leaving G50 to S15. 
The expressway heads west, passing Xiantao to the south of downtown, and meets the north-south bound Hubei S49 Suizhou-Yueyang Expressway near the town of Maozui. In Jingzhou, G50 passes downtown Jingzhou to the north, and intersects with G55 Erenhot–Guangzhou Expressway. Then, G50 turns southwest to concur with Hubei S63 Laohekou-Shishou Expressway. The remainder of the original Hanyi Expressway() is designated as Hubei S48 Huting-Yichang Expressway to serve as a connector to downtown Yichang. Four lanes of G50 are then carried across Yangtze River via Yichang Bridge and encounters Hubei S68 Fanba Expressway in Dianjun District. From there, rugged landscape and mountainous terrain of southwestern Hubei necessitates the construction of numerous bridges and tunnels in Changyang Tujia Autonomous County and Enshi Tujia and Miao Autonomous Prefecture. Among the notable bridges in that area are the 
Longtanhe Bridge, Tieluoping Bridge, Sidu River Bridge, Qingjiang Bridge, and Xuewan Tunnel. At the village of Baiyangtang, G50 enters Chongqing Municipality.

Chongqing
In Chongqing, G50 carries some of the most extraordinary long tunnels along its route. The expressway again crosses to the north of the Yangtze over the Zhongxian Huyu Expressway Bridge in Zhong County. The expressway also passes through Dianjiang County and travels southwest bound, meeting G42 Shanghai-Chengdu Expressway, G5001 Chongqing Ring Expressway, and G65 Baotou-Maoming Expressway before reaching its westernmost terminus in Jiangbei District, where G50 meets G75 Lanzhou-Haikou Expressway near Shapucun.

Major intersections

References

Chinese national-level expressways
Expressways in Shanghai
Expressways in Jiangsu
Expressways in Zhejiang
Expressways in Anhui
Expressways in Hubei
Expressways in Chongqing